HealthCentral is an American privately owned online health company, that was founded by an emergency department doctor in 1999. HealthCentral was later acquired by a group of venture investors in 2005. Initial investments were made from Polaris Venture Partners, Sequoia Capital, The Carlyle Group, and Allen & Company. In 2005, the group of new investors then brought on Christopher M. Schroeder as CEO. In 2008, InterActiveCorp made a significant minority investment in the company, and the initial group of investors joined in the round of funding to reinvest in HealthCentral.

HealthCentral's mission statement is "empower people to improve and take control of their health and well-being." The company owns 35 health sites focused on specific conditions.

In 2006, HealthCentral acquired FoodFit.com, an online wellness resource focused on healthy eating and active living. In 2008, HealthCentral acquired consumer drug information company MedTrackAlert and HIV/AIDS website The Body.com. The company acquired health technology company Wellsphere.com in 2009.

References

External links
 HealthCentral.com
 About HealthCentral
 TheBody.com
 Wellsphere
 Huntingtonbeachthyroiddoctor.com

Health care companies based in Virginia
The Carlyle Group